Antoni Siurana i Zaragoza (born 23 February 1943 in Lleida) is a Spanish politician affiliated with the Partit dels Socialistes de Catalunya. He was mayor of Lleida from 1979–1987 and 1989–2003. From 2003–2006, Siurana was the Minister of Agriculture, Livestock and Fisheries of the Generalitat de Catalunya.

References

1943 births
Living people
People from Lleida
Socialists' Party of Catalonia politicians
Mayors of places in Catalonia